Nautilus was a schooner launched in 1799. The United States Navy purchased her in May 1803 and commissioned her USS Nautilus; she thus became the first ship to bear that name. She served in the First Barbary War. She was altered to a brigantine.  The British captured Nautilus early in the War of 1812 and renamed her HMS Emulous. After her service with the Royal Navy, the Admiralty sold her in 1817.

Origins
Henry Spencer built Nautilus in 1799 as a merchant vessel on the Eastern Shore of Maryland. The Navy purchased her at Baltimore, Maryland, from Thomas Tennant. She was commissioned 24 June 1803, under Lieutenant Richard Somers.

First Barbary War
Nautilus sailed to Hampton Roads, whence she got underway on 30 June for the Mediterranean, carrying dispatches for the U.S. Mediterranean Squadron stationed there assigned to protect the interests of the United States and its citizens residing or trading in that area, and threatened at that time by the Barbary States.

Constitution arrived at Gibraltar on 12 September, and after provisioning, the squadron, less , sailed 6 October with vessels of Capt. Rodgers's squadron to Tangier. This display of naval strength induced the Emperor of Morocco to renew the treaty of 1786.

On 31 October 1803, the Tripolitans captured Philadelphia and the squadron's interests came to focus on Tripoli and Tunis. Using Syracuse as their rendezvous point, the vessels appeared off Tunis and Tripoli at different times between November 1803 and May 1804. In February 1804, while Lieutenant Stephen Decatur daringly sailed  into Tripoli harbor and burned the captured Philadelphia, Nautilus cruised off Tunis.

Toward the end of the month Nautilus retired to Syracuse, returning to Tripoli in mid-March. During May and June she repaired at Messina. Departing 5 July, she joined Constitution off Tripoli on 25 July. During August and early September, she took part in the siege of Tripoli and saw action in five general attacks between 3 August and 3 September. For the next five months, she continued to cruise off Tripoli and Tunis, retiring periodically to Syracuse and Malta, whence in February 1805, she sailed to Livorno to acquire a new mainmast.

On 27 April 1805, she arrived off Derna to participate in the attack, capture, and occupation of that town. She remained until 17 May, during which time she provided cover for the forces of Hamet Caramanli, former Bashaw of Tripoli, as they went into action against the army of Hamet's brother Yusuf ibn Ali Karamanli, who had overthrown Hamet and assumed his title. Departing on the 17th, Nautilus retired to Malta with dispatches and casualties. At the end of the month, she returned to Tripoli and on 10 June hostilities ceased with the signing of a peace treaty.

Nautilus remained in the Mediterranean for a year after the treaty went into effect, conducting operations from Malta and Gibraltar. In the spring of 1806 she was assigned to Algiers for dispatch duty, sailing in June for the United States.

Between wars
Arriving at Washington, D.C., in mid-July, Nautilus entered the Washington Navy Yard there and was placed in ordinary. Reactivated in 1808, she was employed on the East Coast until entering the Navy Yard again in 1810. The Navy then altered her to a brig, giving her a battery of twelve 18-pounder (8 kg) carronades. The Navy recommissioned Nautilus in 1811 and she joined Stephen Decatur's squadron.

Capture
After the War of 1812 with Britain broke out on 18 June 1812, Nautilus gained the dubious distinction of being the first vessel lost on either side. Nautilus was 24 hours out on a cruise from New York when Shannon and Aeolus captured her on 17 July. At the time of her capture she mounted 16 guns, had crew of 106 men and was under the command of Lieutenant William M. Crane.

HMS Emulous
On 29 August the Admiralty formally purchased Nautilus/Emulous for £3,252 17s 2d. On 2 February 1813 Emulous was commissioned under Commander William Mackenzie Godfrey, on the Halifax station.

Emulous proceeded to capture a number of American privateers or merchant vessels listed below:

 On 25 August 1812, Emulous captured the American ship Gossamer. That same day, Emulous captured the American privateer schooner Science, under the command of Captain W. Fernald. Science, of 74 tons, five guns, and 52 men was on a cruise out of Portsmouth.
 On 17 September 1812, Emulous was among the vessels sharing in Spartans capture of the Melantho on 17 September. Melantho of 402 tons, William Davidson, master, had been sailing from Chile to Boston with a cargo of 229 tons of copper, nine bales of furs, and $48,000. 
 On 21 September 1812,  and  captured the brig Ambition, sailing from Baltimore to Boston on 21 September 1812. Emulous and  shared in the prize money. Ambition, Benjamin Shaw, of 139 tons (bm), master, had been carrying 804 barrels of flour.
 On 5 April 1813, she captured the American schooner privateer Cossack. Cossack, of Salem, 48 tons (bm), was pierced for 10 guns but carried only one long 18-pounder and had a crew of 40 men. Cossack arrived at Saint John, New Brunswick on 8 April. Cossac, a schooner, had been under the command of Jonathon Upton.
On 18 April Emulous captured the American ship Bird. Bird, J.Hammond, master, was a schooner of 80 tons (bm), and carrying a cargo of 3,700 "hhd" of staves and 20,000 shingles. She had been sailing from Frenchman's Bay to the Spanish Main when Emulous captured her; Emulous took her into New Brunswick.
 On 5 May, Emulous, Shannon, and  captured the schooner Ann, of 142 tons, sailing from New Orleans to Bordeaux. Ann, J.B.Allison, master, was carrying a cargo of cotton, lead, and skins. That same day Nymphe, together with the same three other British ships, captured the American privateer Montgomery, of 12 guns and a crew of 75 (or 90) men. She was on her way home after a two-month cruise off the coast of Ireland. Montgomery, of Salem, was under the command of J.Strout.  
 On 4 August 1813, Emulous recaptured the schooner Four Brothers, of 330 tons (bm), R. Sinclair, master.
 On 21 or 24 September 1813, the Canadian privateer Dart drove the American privateer Orange, a chebacco boat of two guns and 11 men, on to Fox Island in Machias Bay on the coast of Maine.
 On 10 October 1813, Emulous destroyed two small American privateers in Passamaquaddy Bay, between Maine and New Brunswick. One was the schooner Orion, of one gun and 16 men; the other was the row boat Camelion, with 17 men and small arms.

Post-war and fate
Commander John Gore then took command on 23 July 1814 and remained until 3 February 1815. On 13 June 1815 Lieutenant John Undrell was promoted to the rank of Commander. He took command of Emulous, still on the Jamaica station. Her last commander was Lieutenant Caleb Jackson (acting). He sailed Emulous to Deptford and paid her off there on 19 June 1816; she was then laid up there. The Admiralty sold her for £900 in August 1817.

Emulous may have become the mercantile Nautilus, a snow of 230 tons (bm), and built in America. Nautilus, D.Coff, master, Tofl, owner, and trade Cowes-St Thomas.

See also
List of ships captured in the 19th century

Notes

Citations

References
 </ref>

External links
Phillips, Michael: Ships of the Old Navy – Emulous (1812). 

Schooners of the United States Navy
Brigs of the United States Navy
Barbary Wars American ships
Vessels captured from the United States Navy
War of 1812 ships of the United States
War of 1812 ships of the United Kingdom
Ships built in Maryland
1799 ships
Captured ships
Brigs of the Royal Navy